Sebastian Stewart Dickinson (25 March 1815 – 23 August 1878) was an English Liberal Party politician who sat in the House of Commons from 1868 to 1874.

Dickinson was the son of Major General Thomas Dickinson, of the Honourable East India Company's  Engineers, and of Hurstpierpoint. He was educated at Eton College and was called to the bar at the Inner Temple in June 1839. He was chairman of Board of Guardians at Stroud, and chairman of  2nd Court of Quarter Sessions for Gloucestershire. He was  a J.P. for Gloucestershire and a captain in the 5th Gloucestershire Rifle Volunteers. He was also a Fellow of the Heraldry Society and a Fellow of the Royal Geographical Society.
 
At the 1868 general election Dickinson was elected as a Member of Parliament (MP) for Stroud. He was re-elected at the 1874 general election, but in April 1874 his election was declared void.

He was Chairman of Barnwood House Hospital, Gloucester from 1862 to 1878. This was a significant private mental asylum which opened in Barnwood in 1860, closing eventually in 1968. The first Chairman was William Henry Hyett, (see below)

Dickinson married Frances Stephana Hyett, daughter of William Henry Hyett of Painswick House, Gloucestershire in 1856.  Their son was Willoughby Dickinson, 1st Baron Dickinson; daughter Frances May, an anaesthetist, was the first wife of surgeon Sir James Berry. He died at the age of 63.

References

External links

Stratford Joseph Gloucestershire Biographical Notes

1815 births
1878 deaths
Liberal Party (UK) MPs for English constituencies
UK MPs 1868–1874
UK MPs 1874–1880
Members of the Inner Temple
Fellows of the Royal Geographical Society
Hyett family
People educated at Eton College
English barristers